The Victory Column (from Sieg ‘victory’ + Säule ‘column’) is a monument in Berlin, Germany. Designed by Heinrich Strack after 1864 to commemorate the Prussian victory in the Second Schleswig War, by the time it was inaugurated on 2 September 1873, Prussia had also defeated Austria and its German allies in the Austro-Prussian War (1866) and France in the Franco-Prussian War (1870–71), giving the statue a new purpose.

Berliners have given the statue the nickname Goldelse, meaning something like "Golden Lizzy".
The Victory Column is a major tourist attraction in the city of Berlin. Its viewing platform, for which a ticket is required, offers a view over Berlin.

History, design, and influences

Design
The base consists of polished red Swedish granite, measuring 18.8 meters square and 7.2 meters high. The base contains four bronze reliefs depicting scenes from the three victories. Measuring 12 meters wide and 2 meters high, they were designed by Moritz Schulz, Karl Keil, Alexander Calandrelli, and Albert Wolff.  Upon the base is a round hall with 16 granite columns measuring 4.7 meters high.  Along the hall's circumference is a glass mosaic designed by Anton von Werner. Four sandstone columns rise above this hall, the first three containing 20 gilded gun barrels each, 12 pounders from the Danish victory, 8 pounders from the Austrian victory, and 4 pounders from the French victory. On top of the fourth sandstone column resides the 8.52 meter tall gilded bronze victory.

The relief decoration was removed in 1945. It was restored for the 750th anniversary of Berlin in 1987 by the French president at that time, François Mitterrand.

Locations
The Victory Column originally stood in Königsplatz (now Platz der Republik). In 1939, as part of the preparation of the monumental plans to redesign Berlin into Welthauptstadt Germania, the Nazis relocated the column to its present site at the Großer Stern (Great Star). At the same time, the column was augmented by another 6.5 metres, giving it its present height of 66.89 metres. The monument survived World War II without much damage. Surrounded by a street circle, the column is also accessible to pedestrians through four tunnels, according to plans by Albert Speer. A spiral staircase leads to a viewing platform under the statue.

Historical significance
During the Battle of Berlin of 1945, Soviet troops nicknamed the column "the Tall Woman". Polish Army troops, fighting alongside their Soviet allies, hoisted the Polish flag on the column on 2 May 1945 at the end of the Battle in Berlin. 

During the allied victory parade in 1945, the French tricolour was raised atop the column on the statue by French troops.

It served as the location for Barack Obama's speech in Berlin as a US presidential candidate during his visit to Germany on 24 July 2008.

In popular culture
The golden statue atop the column, cast in 1873 by the Aktien-Gesellschaft Gladenbeck foundry in Berlin, was featured in the music video to U2's 1993 "Stay (Faraway, So Close!)".

In Wim Wenders' Wings of Desire (1987), the column is one of many such high places in the city where angels sit and look down.

During the years of the techno Love Parade, the column was a meeting point where large numbers of people danced together.

The Berlin queer monthly magazine Siegessäule was named after the monument, founded 1984 as a gay publication. The Berlin Pride (CSD parade) usually includes the column on its route for the symbolism.

The monument is one of the many landmarks visited in the "Berlin Byways" course in Mario Kart Tour (since 2021), and later Mario Kart 8 Deluxe (since 2022).

References

External links

 

1873 sculptures
Buildings and structures in Mitte
Monumental columns in Germany
Monuments and memorials in Berlin
Terminating vistas in Germany
Victory monuments
Tiergarten (park)
Sculptures of Victoria (mythology)
1873 establishments in Germany